The 1978–79 Liga Artzit season saw Hakoah Ramat Gan win the title and win promotion to Liga Leumit. Maccabi Ramat Amidar and Hapoel Petah Tikva were also promoted.

Hapoel Marmorek, Hapoel Netanya and Hapoel Ashdod were all relegated to Liga Alef.

Final table

References
1978–79 Maccabi Haifa 

Liga Artzit seasons
Israel
2